Thee Mighty Caesars were a Medway scene garage/punk group, formed by Billy Childish (vocals/guitar) in 1985 after the demise of The Milkshakes, alongside John Agnew (bass) and Graham Day (drums), who initially was still also in fellow Medway band The Prisoners.

Bruce Brand (ex-Pop Rivets/Milkshakes) later replaced Day, who formed his own band The Prime Movers with fellow Prisoner Allan Crockford and Wolf Howard (ex-Daggermen). Childish/Brand then formed new band Thee Headcoats.

Discography

Albums
Thee Mighty Caesars (1985)
Beware the Ides of the March (1985)
Thee Caesars of Trash (1986)
Acropolis Now (1986)
Wiseblood (1987) 
John Lennon’s Corpse Revisited (1989)

Compilations
Live in Rome (1987) [studio recordings with overdubbed 'live' effects]
Don't Give Any Dinner to Henry Chinaski (1987) [demos]
Punk Rock Showcase (1987) 
Thusly, thee Mighty Caesars (English Punk Rock Explosion) (1989) (U.S.)
Surely They Were the Sons of God (1989) (U.S.)
Caesars Remains (1992) 
Caesars Pleasure (1994)

References

English punk rock groups
Garage punk groups
British garage rock groups
Musical groups from Kent